Geoffrey Key (born 13 May 1941 in Rusholme, Manchester, England) is a British painter and sculptor. A number of public art collections have examples of his work.

Early life and education
Key's mother, Marion, worked as an illustrator, and encouraged him to draw.

Key was educated at the Manchester High School of Art, whose headmaster, Ernest Goodman, established the Salford Art Club. After Goodman's death, its members chose Key as the Honorary President.

In 1958, Key enrolled at the Manchester Regional College of Art. At the college, Key was tutored by sculptor Ted Roocroft and painter Harry Rutherford.

After gaining the National Diploma of Design and the Diploma of Associateship of Manchester, the latter with distinction, Key took up a postgraduate scholarship in sculpture. His academic awards include the Heywood Medal in Fine Art and the Guthrie Bond Travelling Scholarship.

Career

Key’s early work included an important period of development during which he concentrated on painting and drawing a specific area of the Derbyshire landscape, the Whiteley Nab hill, south of Glossop. Key created hundreds of images of this one landscape. Key later revealed that the purpose of this dedicated period of study was to build upon the firm foundation established by his academic training, whilst divesting himself of the influences he had absorbed in order to arrive at his own personal artistic language.

During this time, Key also worked as an art teacher at Broughton High Secondary School in Salford.  Key left this job as his reputation grew and galleries such as Salford Art Gallery, The Rutherston Loan Collection and North West Arts began acquiring his works.

Key was elected to membership of the Manchester Academy of Fine Arts in 1968 and was a prize winner in 1971. During this time, he was also commissioned to produce artworks by three companies in North West England – Mather & Platt, the former Richard Johnson & Nephew company, and the former Wilson’s Brewery.  The Richard Johnson & Nephew pictures are now held by the Museum of Science and Industry (MOSI) in Manchester. Of the Manchester Academy Exhibition in 1979, Jane Clifford, writing in The Daily Telegraph commented "Perhaps the artist that stands out most is Geoffrey Key" "His female forms show a self confidence which is compelling".

In the 1980s the French company Société des Caves de Roquefort also commissioned work. Further successful exhibitions were held in both the United Kingdom and abroad. In 1987, the Manchester Evening News asked Key to write an article on L. S. Lowry, who Key had known well, for a feature marking the centenary of the artist's birth. This article was accompanied by a contemporary drawing of Lowry by Key.

In the early 1990s Key visited Hong Kong to exhibit his work in a gallery at the Mandarin Oriental Hotel. Key has stated that this, his first visit to Asia, was to prove a catalyst in a change in the use of colour in his work. An earlier predominance of muted tones was replaced with a fuller and more vibrant palette, which has remained an enduring aspect of his art. Of the exhibition, Asian Art News said "It is the emotion and pleasure of making art that comes through so clearly in Key's work and makes it sparkle".

Key’s career as an artist now spans five decades and his work and exhibitions have been widely appraised and reviewed. His paintings and sculpture feature in several public art collections in North West England, including Salford and Manchester Art Galleries. His work is also held in private and corporate collections including the National Westminster Bank, Mandarin Oriental Hong Kong, the Hong Kong Jockey Club, the Chateau de St Ouen and Perrier. Key has represented the UK in invited exhibitions in Europe. Shows have taken place across the UK, Europe, Asia, Australia and the USA and his work is exhibited and sold in galleries in the UK, Ireland, the US and Hong Kong.

In May 2013 Key's work was exhibited at Messum's Art Gallery in London. Decscribed as one of the most important living painters, prices for Key's work have risen steadily over the last decade.

Key has also published several books. G Key - A Book of Drawings and Interview (1975), Daydreams (1981), Clowns (2001), Geoffrey Key Twentieth Century Drawings (2002), Images (2004), Geoffrey Key Paintings (2008), Birds (2010). Signature Book (2011).

In 2011 Key was filmed for a documentary about his work and life by Andy Pacino, a filmmaker and author from Manchester. It had the working title Saltglaze Pot.

Speaking with the Manchester Evening News in October 2009 Key said of his style and manner of working "If I'm doing a still life. I'll set it up, look at it for an hour or so, put it away and then paint it. I find the mind's great at distilling, at breaking it down into essentials.  If I'm looking at it I find myself copying every detail, and that isn't necessary. I couldn't sit in a field painting a landscape because I would just feel I'm copying nature when photography can do a better job. Painting it from memory, recreating in on canvas can do quite another job".

References

Other news coverage
 Geoffrey Key an artist of significance, Cheshire Today 2015
 The Figurative Art of Everyday Life by Geoffrey Key, Platform505.com, 10 June 2013
 Key Unlocks the Past, Lancashire Life, October 2009 Edition page 60
 Manchester artist Geoffrey Key shows individuality, Lancashire Life, 28 December 2009 
 Light is a key to a great leap forward, Manchester Evening News Edition, Friday October 16, 2009
 Jane Clifford Humour and colour in new-look academy, The Telegraph, February 2, 1979
 Video: Geoffrey Key, Salford's best kept secret, Salfordonline, 25 August 2010

Bibliography
 The Northern School: A Reappraisal, Martin Regan, 
 The Northern School Revisited, Peter Davies, 
 Geoffrey Key Paintings, Judith M O'Leary 
 Infinite Jest, Judith M O'Leary, 
 Isolated Heads, Nick Brown OBE

External links
In the footsteps of Lowry How Manchester artists sought to escape the overwhelming influence of L.S.Lowry. Featuring Geoffrey Key and Reg Gardner with commentary by John Robert-Blunn.

 Geoffrey Key's work at Gateway Gallery

1941 births
Living people
20th-century British painters
20th-century British sculptors
21st-century British painters
Artists from Manchester
British male painters
British male sculptors
20th-century British male artists
21st-century British male artists